Kyrian Chinazorm Nwabueze (born 11 December 1992) is a Nigerian-American professional footballer who plays as a forward for Malaysia Super League club Kuala Lumpur City.

Club career

Youth and College
Nwabueze played one year of college soccer at El Camino College in 2013, where he scored 19 goals.

Professional
Nwabueze had spells with USL PDL club Los Angeles Misioneros in 2013 and 2014, while also playing with Armenian side FC Banants in 2014, where he made six appearances and scored one goal in all competitions. He signed with United Soccer League club Tulsa Roughnecks in March 2015 making his fully professional debut during the season opener on March 28, 2015, entering the game at the 62nd minute.

In February 2016, Nwabueze signed for Armenian side Ararat Yerevan, leaving the club on 28 October 2016.

In January 2017, Nwabueze went on trial with FC Shirak, signing a two-year contract with Shirak on 28 February 2017.
At the beginning of August 2017, Nwabueze left Shirak, signing for Slovenian PrvaLiga side ND Gorica on a three-year contract on 15 September 2017.

Career statistics

Honours
Shirak
 Armenian Cup: 2016–17

References

External links

1992 births
Living people
Soccer players from California
Nigerian footballers
American soccer players
Association football forwards
USL League Two players
USL Championship players
Armenian Premier League players
Slovenian PrvaLiga players
Macedonian First Football League players
Football Superleague of Kosovo players
Kategoria Superiore players
Malaysia Super League players
LA Laguna FC players
FC Tulsa players
FC Urartu players
FC Ararat Yerevan players
FC Shirak players
ND Gorica players
FK Pobeda players
FC Drita players
KF Laçi players
Kuala Lumpur City F.C. players
American expatriate soccer players
American expatriate sportspeople in Armenia
Expatriate footballers in Armenia
American expatriate sportspeople in Slovenia
Expatriate footballers in Slovenia
American expatriate sportspeople in North Macedonia
Expatriate footballers in North Macedonia
American expatriate sportspeople in Kosovo
Expatriate footballers in Kosovo
American expatriate sportspeople in Albania
Expatriate footballers in Albania
American expatriate sportspeople in Malaysia
Expatriate footballers in Malaysia